The Ministry of Energy and Natural Resources is the government ministry of Republic of Turkey responsible for natural resources and energy in Turkey. The ministry is headed by Fatih Dönmez. Despite the ministry being represented on the Climate Change and Air Management Coordination Board, the European Commission has criticised the lack of co-ordination between policy on climate change in Turkey and the energy policy of Turkey.

References

Sources

 
Turkey
1963 establishments in Turkey
Turkey